1979 XB is a lost asteroid with a short observation arc of 3.9 days that cannot be recovered with targeted observations and awaits serendipitous survey observations. It is classified as a near-Earth object and potentially hazardous asteroid of the Apollo group and is estimated to be  in diameter. The unnumbered minor planet has a poorly constrained orbit and has not been observed in 40 years. It has been listed on the Sentry Risk Table since the list started in 2002. With a cumulative Palermo Technical Impact Hazard Scale of −2.72, the poorly known orbit and assumed size place 1979 XB third on an unconstrained listing of the Sentry Risk Table.

1979 XB was first observed on 11 December 1979 by astronomers at the Siding Spring Observatory, Australia, when the asteroid was estimated to be  from Earth and had a solar elongation of 127°. The object has never been confirmed by a second observatory. The uncertainty region for this asteroid is now hundreds of millions of kilometers long.

Orbit-fit 
With a short 4-day observation arc, the trajectory is poorly constrained and the uncertainties fit numerous different orbits. The perihelion point (closest approach to the Sun) is better known than the aphelion point (furthest distance from the Sun). Due to the uncertainty, the orbital period ranges from 2.4 to 4.2 years.

2024 
Around mid-December 2024 the asteroid has about a 0.05% chance of making an Earth approach within 0.1 AU.

2056 virtual impactor 
JPL Horizons suggests that the closest approach the asteroid will make to Earth in 2056 is a distant  on 4 August 2056. NEODyS expects the closest Earth approach to be an even more distant  on 2 October 2056.

With a short 4-day observation arc, the Sentry Risk Table shows an estimated 1 in 5 million chance of the asteroid impacting Earth on 12 December 2056.

See also

References

External links 
 
 
 

Minor planet object articles (unnumbered)

Lost minor planets

Potential impact events caused by near-Earth objects
19791211